The 2015 Tour des Fjords was the eighth edition of the Tour des Fjords cycle stage race. It was a part of the 2015 UCI Europe Tour as a 2.1 event.

Schedule
The race was held over five stages.

Teams
21 teams were selected to take place in the 2015 Tour des Fjords. Four of these were UCI WorldTeams, six were UCI Professional Continental teams, and eleven were UCI Continental teams.

Stages

Stage 1
27 May 2015 — Bergen to Norheimsund,

Stage 2
28 May 2015 — Jondal to Haugesund,

Stage 3
29 May 2015 — Stord to Sauda,

Stage 4
30 May 2015 — Stavanger to Sandnes,

Stage 5
31 May 2015 — Hinna to Stavanger,

Classification leadership table
In the 2015 Tour des Fjords, four different jerseys were awarded. For the general classification, calculated by adding each cyclist's finishing times on each stage, and allowing time bonuses (10, 6 and 4 seconds respectively) for the first three finishers on mass-start stages, the leader received a gold jersey. Additionally, there was a points classification, awarding a dark blue jersey, and a mountains classification, the leadership of which was marked by a polka dot jersey. The fourth jersey represented the young rider classification, marked by a white jersey. This was decided in the same way as the general classification, but only young riders were eligible. There was also a classification for teams.

Final standings

General classification

Points classification

Mountains classification

Young rider classification

Teams classification

References

External links

Tour des Fjords
Tour des Fjords
Tour des Fjords